The Nutcracker, also known as George Balanchine's The Nutcracker, is a 1993 American Christmas musical film based on Peter Martins's stage production and directed by Emile Ardolino. It stars Darci Kistler, Damian Woetzel, Kyra Nichols, Bart Robinson Cook, Macaulay Culkin, Jessica Lynn Cohen, Wendy Whelan, Margaret Tracey, Gen Horiuchi, Tom Gold, and the New York City Ballet.

The film was released by Warner Bros. under their Warner Bros. Family Entertainment label on November 24, 1993, four days after director Ardolino died. It received mixed reviews and was a box office failure, grossing only $2 million.

Plot
The film follows the traditional plot of the Nutcracker.

Act I 
Scene 1: The Stahlbaum Home

It is Christmas Eve. Family and friends have gathered in the parlor to decorate the beautiful Christmas tree in preparation for the party. Once it is finished, the children are sent for. They stare in awe at it sparkling with candles and decorations.

The party begins. A march is played. Presents are given out to the children. Suddenly, as the owl-topped grandmother clock strikes eight, a mysterious figure enters the room. It is Herr Drosselmeyer, a local councilman, magician, and Marie's godfather. He is also a talented toymaker who has brought gifts for the children, including four lifelike dolls who dance to the delight of all. He then has them put away for safekeeping.

Marie and her brother, Fritz, are sad to see the dolls being taken away, but Drosselmeyer has yet another toy for them: a wooden nutcracker carved in the shape of a little man. The other children ignore it, but Marie immediately takes a liking to it. Fritz, however, breaks it, and she is heartbroken.

During the night, after everyone else has gone to bed, Marie returns to the parlor to check on her beloved nutcracker. As she reaches the little bed she put it on, the clock strikes midnight and she looks up to see Drosselmeyer perched atop it. Suddenly, mice begin to fill the room and the Christmas tree begins to grow to dizzying heights. The nutcracker also grows to life size. Marie finds herself in the midst of a battle between an army of gingerbread soldiers and the mice, led by their king. They begin to eat the soldiers.

The nutcracker appears to lead the soldiers, who are joined by tin soldiers, and dolls who serve as doctors to carry away the wounded. As the Mouse King advances on the still-wounded nutcracker, Marie throws her slipper at him, distracting him long enough for the nutcracker to stab him.

Scene 2: A Pine Forest

The mice retreat and the nutcracker is transformed into a handsome Prince. He leads Marie through the moonlit night to a pine forest in which the snowflakes come to life and dance around them, beckoning them on to his kingdom as the first act ends.

Act II 
Scene 1: The Land of Sweets

Marie and the Prince travel to the beautiful Land of Sweets, ruled by the Sugar Plum Fairy in the Prince's place until his return. He recounts for her how he had been saved from the Mouse King by Marie and transformed back into himself.
In honor of the young heroine, a celebration of sweets from around the world is produced: chocolate from Spain, coffee from Arabia, tea from China, and candy canes from Russia all dance for their amusement; Danish shepherdesses perform on their flutes; Mother Ginger has her children, the Polichinelles, emerge from under her enormous hoop skirt to dance; a string of beautiful flowers perform a waltz. To conclude the night, the Sugar Plum Fairy and her Cavalier perform a dance.

A final waltz is performed by all the sweets, after which the Sugar Plum Fairy ushers Marie and the Prince down from their throne. He bows to her, she kisses Marie goodbye, and leads them to a reindeer-drawn sleigh. It takes off as they wave goodbye to all the subjects who wave back.

Cast 
Darci Kistler as The Sugar Plum Fairy
Damian Woetzel as The Sugar Plum Fairy's Cavalier
Kyra Nichols as Dewdrop
Wendy Whelan as Coffee
Margaret Tracey as Marzipan
Gen Horiuchi as Tea
Tom Gold as Candy Cane
Lourdes López as Hot Chocolate
Nilas Martins as Hot Chocolate
William Otto as Mother Ginger
Peter Reznick as Fritz
Karin von Aroldingen as Grandparent
Edward Bigelow as Grandparent
Heather Watts as Frau Stahlbaum
Robert LaFosse as Dr. Stahlbaum
Bart Robinson Cook as Herr Drosselmeyer
Jessica Lynn Cohen as Marie Stahlbaum
Macaulay Culkin as The Nutcracker/Prince/Drosselmeyer's Nephew
Kevin Kline as Narrator
Katrina Killian as Harlequin
Roma Sosenko as Columbine
Michael Byars as Soldier
Robert D. Lyon as Mouse King 
Maureen C. McFadden Devlin as Drummer

Reception

Critical response
The film received generally mixed reviews from critics. Based on eight reviews, it holds a rotten rating of 50% on review aggregator Rotten Tomatoes, with an average rating of 6/10. The film was criticized by James Berardinelli for not capturing the excitement of a live performance; he wrote that it "opts to present a relatively mundane version of the stage production...utilizing almost none of the advantages offered by the (film) medium." Roger Ebert of the Chicago Sun-Times was mixed on it, and gave it 2 out of 4 stars criticizing it for not adapting the dance for a film audience and also its casting of Culkin who, he writes, "seems peripheral to all of the action, sort of like a celebrity guest or visiting royalty, nodding benevolently from the corners of shots." In The Washington Post, Lucy Linfield echoed Ebert's criticism of Culkin, stating that "it's not so much that he can't act or dance; more important, the kid seems to have forgotten how to smile...all little Mac can muster is a surly grimace." She praised the dancing, however, as "strong, fresh and in perfect sync" and Kistler's Sugar Plum Fairy as "the Balanchinean ideal of a romantic, seemingly fragile beauty combined with a technique of almost startling strength, speed and knifelike precision." The New York Times' Stephen Holden also criticized Culkin, calling his performance the film's "only serious flaw", but praised the cinematography as "very scrupulous in the way it establishes a mood of participatory excitement, then draws back far enough so that the classic ballet sequences choreographed by Balanchine and staged by Peter Martins can be seen in their full glory."

Box office
During its theatrical run, the film grossed $2,119,994. In North America, it opened at number 16 in its first weekend with $783,721.

See also
 List of Christmas films

References

External links 
 
 

1993 films
Ballet films
American Christmas films
Warner Bros. films
Films based on The Nutcracker and the Mouse King
Films directed by Emile Ardolino
Filmed stage productions
Regency Enterprises films
1990s English-language films
1990s American films